Marcus Robinson may refer to:

 Marcus Robinson (American football) (born 1975), former American football player
 Marcus Robinson (artist) (born 1959), artist and documentarian
 Marcus Robinson (prisoner) (born 1973), former death row prisoner who had his sentence commuted to life imprisonment following a landmark case in South California, U.S.
 Marc Robinson (politician) (Marcus Laurence Robinson, born 1953), former Australian politician

See also
Mark Robinson (disambiguation)